Jan Sten Otto Drakenberg (born 28 July 1966) is a Swedish CEO and Board professional – and a former elite athlete in fencing and international ocean racing. He competed in the individual and team épée events at the 1988 Summer Olympics.

Drakenberg started his professional career at Procter & Gamble and then moved on as CEO for Goodyear Dunlop Nordic. In 2007 he became CEO for Carlsberg Group, Sweden and between 2011 and 2015, Drakenberg was CEO for Norwegian wholesaler Arcus-Gruppen.

References

External links
 

1966 births
Living people
Swedish male épée fencers
Olympic fencers of Sweden
Fencers at the 1988 Summer Olympics
Sportspeople from Stockholm
20th-century Swedish people